Bjorn van den Ende (born 10 January 1986) is a Dutch representative rower. He has competed for the Netherlands as both a lightweight and heavyweight. He competed in the men's lightweight coxless four event at the Rio 2016 Olympics and in the Dutch heavyweight men's eight at Tokyo 2020.

Representative rowing career
After the Rio Olympics at age 30, he switched from lightweight to heavyweight rowing. From 2017, he was seated in the Men's Eight the 'Holland 8', won silver at the 2019 World Rowing Championships and thus qualifying for the 2020 Summer Olympics in Tokyo. At Tokyo 2020 the Dutch men's eight won their heat, then finished 5th in the A final for an overall fifth placing at the Olympic regatta.

References

External links
 

1986 births
Living people
Dutch male rowers
Olympic rowers of the Netherlands
Rowers at the 2016 Summer Olympics
Rowers at the 2020 Summer Olympics
People from Naarden
World Rowing Championships medalists for the Netherlands
Sportspeople from North Holland
20th-century Dutch people
21st-century Dutch people